Kamrin Brian Moore (born October 1, 1996) is a former American football safety. He played college football at Boston College, where he was a three-year starter at cornerback. His 2015 season was shortened by a tibia fracture. Moore missed the end of his senior season with a shoulder injury and still had 50 total tackles with nine pass breakups in 2017.

Professional career

New Orleans Saints
Moore was drafted by the New Orleans Saints in the sixth round, 189th overall, of the 2018 NFL Draft. The Saints previously acquired the pick in a trade that sent Adrian Peterson to the Arizona Cardinals. On May 10, 2018, Moore signed his rookie contract with the Saints. He was waived by the Saints on September 1, 2018.

New York Giants
On September 2, 2018, Moore was claimed off waivers by the New York Giants.

On July 15, 2019, Moore was suspended by the team following an arrest for an alleged domestic violence-related incident. He was placed on the NFL commissioner's exempt list on July 24, 2019. He was waived by the Giants on August 31, 2019.

DC Defenders
On November 22, 2019, Moore was drafted by the DC Defenders in the 2020 XFL Supplemental Draft.

Legal issues
On July 11, 2019, Moore was arrested in Linden, New Jersey for third-degree assault, where he allegedly knocked a woman unconscious. Four days later, the Giants suspended Moore. A judge ordered the restraining order dropped on August 14, 2019. He was cleared by a grand jury on October 29, 2019.

References

External links
 Boston College Eagles football bio

1996 births
American football cornerbacks
Boston College Eagles football players
DC Defenders players
living people
New Orleans Saints players
New York Giants players
people from District Heights, Maryland